Sattari  is a village in Malda district of the state of West Bengal, India. Sattari is known for producing mango (aam) supply,  lace (gamchha), and carpet work. It is the headquarters of Binodpur Gram Panchayat (village council) on which it is represented by 6 of the 13 seats.

Geography

Location
Sattari is located at  the English Bazar tehsil or community development block of Maldah district in West Bengal, India. It is at the border of English Bazar and Mothabari on the Pagla River, a tributary of the Ganges.

Area overview
The area shown in the adjoining map is the physiographic sub-region known as the diara. It “is a relatively well drained flat land formed by the fluvial deposition of newer alluvium.” The most note-worthy feature is the Farakka Barrage across the Ganges.The area is a part of the Malda Sadar subdivision, which is an overwhelmingly rural region, but the area shown in the map has pockets of urbanization with 17 census towns, concentrated mostly in the Kaliachak I CD block.The bank of the Ganges between Bhutni and Panchanandapur (both the places are marked on the map), is the area worst hit  by left bank erosion, a major problem in the Malda area.The ruins of Gauda, capital of several empires, is located in this area.

Note: The map alongside presents some of the notable locations in the area. All places marked in the map are linked in the larger full screen map.

Weather

Climate
The accurate weather of Sattari is normally to other places in West Bengal, with a tropical climate, specifically a tropical wet and dry climate(Aw) under the Köppen climate classification, with seven months of dryness and peak of rains in July to October.The cooler season from December to February is followed by the summer season from March to June.RealFeel®: 34° Winds: 7 km/h SEGusts: 11 km/h Humidity: 88%Dew Point: 26° UVIndex: 0(Low)Cloud Cover: 99% Rain: 2 mmSnow: 0 CM Ice: 0mmVisibility: 6 km Ceiling: 9144 mWet Bulb: 27°

Demographics
As of 2011 Indian Census, Sattari had a total population of 10,538, of which 5,458 were males and 5,080 were females, with a sex ratio of 930. Population within the age group of 0 to 6 years was 1,575. The total number of literates in Sattari was 4,977, which constituted 47.2% of the population with male literacy of 52.9% and female literacy of 41.1%. The effective literacy rate of 7+ population of Sattari was 55.5%, of which male literacy rate was 62.0% and female literacy rate was 48.5%. The Scheduled Castes population was 3,043. Sattari had 2318 households in 2011.

Administration
Sattari village is administrated by Binodpur Gram Panchayat of the English Bazar community development block of Malda district. Sattari is the headquarters of the village council and is represented by six of the thirteen seats; four are Muslim and two are Hindu. Sattari falls under the jurisdiction of the English Bazar Police Station.Sattari's four peoples nabs by NIA from Kolkata for possession of fake currency.

Festivals
Almost all of the major religious festivals are celebrated, like
 Durga puja
 Kali Puja
 Diwali
 Eid al-Fitr
 Eid al-Adha
 Muharram
 Milad un-Nabi
 Shab-e-Barat
 Ratha-Yatra
 Maha Shivratri

Fairs
Some of the mostly reputed cultural fairs of the town are
.
Eid Fair, at Sattari Eid Gah Field
 Muharram Fair, at Sattari Karbala Maidan
 Kali Puja Fair, at Kagmari Bridge

Places of interest
 Binodpur Gram Panchayat

Education
Sattari High School is a Bengali-medium coeducational institution established in 1971. It has facilities for teaching from class V to class XII. It has a playground, a library with 2050 books, and 10 computers for teaching and learning purposes.

Transport
Taxi cabs and buses are the best way to get around this city, with public and private bus service available within the town. There are options to rent cars and bicycles.

Gallery

See also
English Bazar (community development block)

References

Villages in Malda district